Bernard Harbour (Inuit: Nulahugiuq) is a bay on the mainland of Nunavut, Canada. It is situated on Dolphin and Union Strait, southwest of Sutton Island.

At one time, it was the site of a Hudson's Bay Company trading post. It is also a former Distant Early Warning Line (PIN-C) and current North Warning System site.

The butterfly Colias johanseni is found in the area.

The Hudson's Bay Company vessel Aklavik over-wintered at Bernard Harbour, in 1930, where she sank.  She was refloated and repaired.

See also
 List of communities in Nunavut

References

Former populated places in the Kitikmeot Region
Ghost towns in Nunavut
Hudson's Bay Company trading posts in Nunavut
Ports and harbours of Nunavut